The Estadio Monumental Banco Pichincha is a football stadium located in the parish of Tarqui in northern Guayaquil, Ecuador. An aerial lift or cable car currently under construction will connect the stadium with the "Aerovia" Julian Coronel station in downtown Guayaquil, which service is scheduled to start in the second half of August 2021. The stadium is the home to Ecuadorian football club Barcelona SC. It has a capacity of 59,283, which makes it the largest stadium in Ecuador.

History
The stadium was born from the initiative of club president Isidro Romero Carbo. He wanted Barcelona, at the time playing their home games at the Estadio Modelo Alberto Spencer Herrera, to have their own stadium.

The stadium was inaugurated on December 27, 1987. The first game was played against FC Barcelona of Spain, which Barcelona SC won 1-0. Barcelona invited many South American football celebrities, such as Pelé, to the inauguration. Pelé was so astonished, he compared the stadium to the famous Maracanã in Rio de Janeiro.

Pelé and his phrase have a golden plaque inside the stadium.

There are health care facilities, apparel-and-souvenir shops, and restaurants, on a total area of about 5,100 m². The football field is 105 metres long and 70 metres wide. The training field near the stadium is called Alternate Field Sigifredo Agapito Chuchuca in honor of one of the greatest midfielders in team history.

The stadium hosted 5 matches of the 1993 Copa América, including the final.

On January 2, 2008, president of Barcelona Eduardo Maruri signed a 4-year contract with Ecuadorian bank Banco Pichincha to have the stadium named after the bank. The contract was renewed but came to an end in 2015.

References

External links

 19 Years of Monumental
 FEF article on name change

Sports venues completed in 1987
Estadio Monumental Isidro Romero Carbo
Football venues in Guayaquil
Football venues in Ecuador
Copa América stadiums
Estadio Monumental Isidro Romero Carbo